James Regan ( 1939) was a Welsh rugby union, and professional rugby league footballer who played in the 1930s.

International honours
Jim Regan won a cap for Wales (RL) while at Huddersfield in 1939.

References

External links
Cardiff RFC Season Review 1934–1935
Cardiff RFC Season Review 1938–1939

Cardiff RFC players
Footballers who switched code
Huddersfield Giants players
Place of birth missing
Place of death missing
Rugby league hookers
Rugby union hookers
Wales national rugby league team players
Welsh rugby league players
Welsh rugby union players
Year of birth missing
Year of death missing